Victor Herbert Fazio Jr. (October 11, 1942 – March 16, 2022) was an American politician who served as a member of the United States House of Representatives for California from 1979 to 1999.

Early life and education
Fazio was born in Winchester, Massachusetts, the son of Betty Virginia (Freeman) and V. Herbert Fazio. He was of Italian and New England Yankee descent. After graduating from Madison High School in Madison, New Jersey in 1960, Fazio attended Williston Academy in Easthampton, Massachusetts in 1961. He earned a B.A. from Union College in Schenectady, New York, in 1965, and did graduate work at California State University, Sacramento, from 1969 to 1972. From 1965 to 1966 he was a Coro Foundation Fellow in Los Angeles.

Political career

California politics 
Fazio was a congressional and legislative consultant from 1966 to 1975, during which time he co-founded California Journal magazine in 1970. He served on the Sacramento County Charter Commission from 1972 to 1974, on the Sacramento County Planning Commission in 1975, and as a member of the California State Assembly from 1975 to 1978.

Fazio was a delegate to California state Democratic conventions in 1976 and 1978, and was a delegate to Democratic National Conventions of 1976, 1980, 1984, 1988, 1992, and 1996.

Congress
Fazio was elected as a Democrat to the 96th and to the nine succeeding Congresses (January 3, 1979 – January 3, 1999). He represented California's 4th congressional district from 1979 to 1993 and after redistricting changed district numbers he represented California's 3rd congressional district from 1993 to 1999.

As congressman, he lobbied to set aside area as a wildlife refuge below the I-80 overpass between Davis and Sacramento. His efforts led to the establishment of the Vic Fazio Yolo Wildlife Area, dedicated in 1997 by President Bill Clinton. The region is in Yolo County and is known to locals as the 'Yolo Bypass,' a seasonal wetlands generated by controlled fall, winter, and spring flooding. The refuge provides valuable winter habitat for waterfowl and shorebirds. It is additionally used as a Pacific Flyway stop-over by migrant waterfowl and shorebirds during fall and spring migrations, and can be accessed for visitation by an auto tour route.

Fazio won his first seven terms without serious difficulty, but his district was made measurably more rural and Republican after the 1990s round of redistricting.  He only won 51 percent of the vote in 1992 against former state senator H.L. Richardson.  In 1994, he was nearly defeated, winning by only three percentage points. In 1996 he was elected by a larger margin, winning 54%.  He announced he would not run for re-election in 1998, in November of the prior year.

Later life
Fazio worked as a senior advisor in the Washington office of Akin Gump Strauss Hauer & Feld and sat on the board of Northrop Grumman. 
He served as co-chair of the Information Technology and Innovation Foundation, a public policy think tank. He also sat on the Council on American Politics, bringing together leaders from across the nation to address issues facing the growth and enrichment of The Graduate School of Political Management. In addition, he served on the board of directors of the Committee for a Responsible Federal Budget. After leaving office, he became involved in political reform efforts, including joining nine other former members of Congress to co-author a 2021 opinion editorial advocating reforms of Congress. He was also a member of the ReFormers Caucus of Issue One.

Personal life and death
After his first marriage to Joella Mason ended in divorce, Fazio was subsequently married to Judy Neidhardt Kern from 1983 until her death in 2015, aged 71. He then married Kathy Sawyer, a retired journalist, in 2017. He had two daughters from his first marriage to Mason, Dana and Anne; Anne died from complications of leukemia in 1995.

Fazio died of melanoma at his home in Arlington County, Virginia, on March 16, 2022, at the age of 79.

References

External links

The Council on American Politics at GW's Graduate School of Political Management
Vic Fazio Papers Catalogue entry at Special Collections Dept., University Library, University of California, Davis
 Vic Fazio at Akin Gump webpage
 

|-

|-

|-

|-

|-

1942 births
2022 deaths
20th-century American politicians
21st-century American politicians
American people of Italian descent
Center for Strategic and Budgetary Assessments
Deaths from cancer in Virginia
Deaths from melanoma
Democratic Party members of the United States House of Representatives from California
Directors of Northrop Grumman
Information Technology and Innovation Foundation
Democratic Party members of the California State Assembly
People from Winchester, Massachusetts
Politicians from Sacramento, California
Union College (New York) alumni
Williston Northampton School alumni
Members of Congress who became lobbyists